Nyceryx alophus is a moth of the  family Sphingidae. It is found from Brazil to Bolivia, Argentina, Paraguay and Uruguay.

The wingspan is about 54 mm. It is similar to Nyceryx continua continua, but the forewing upperside is more variegated because the lines are more distinct. The discal spot is narrow and elongate and there is a subbasal blackish band. The hindwing upperside has a basal yellow area which reaches the inner margin.

Adults are probably on wing year round.

Subspecies
Nyceryx alophus alophus (Brazil to Bolivia, Argentina, Paraguay and Uruguay)
Nyceryx alophus ixion Rothschild & Jordan, 1903 (Bolivia and Paraguay)

References

Nyceryx
Moths described in 1875